Alessio Antonini (born 7 June 1949) is an Italian former professional racing cyclist. He rode in the 1975 Tour de France and 1976 Tour de France.

References

External links
 

1949 births
Living people
Italian male cyclists
People from Salò
Cyclists from the Province of Brescia